Statistics of Japan Soccer League for the 1981 season.

First Division
Fujita Industries won their third League title.

Nippon Steel, one of eight inaugural member of the First Division in 1965 as Yawata Steel, was defeated by Second Division runner-up Nissan in the playout and relegated, never to play top flight football again. Yamaha Motors was relegated in bottom place, having won only two matches.

Promotion/relegation Series

Second Division
NKK and Nissan returned after two years in the second tier, NKK also grabbing the Emperor's Cup.

Kofu Club saved itself from relegation yet again by defeating NTT West Japan Kyoto, who were looking to regain their League place. Nagoya Soccer Club, an amateur outfit who never looked like League material, went back to the Tokai regional league after a single attempt.

Promotion/relegation Series

References
Japan - List of final tables (RSSSF)

Japan Soccer League seasons
1
Jap
Jap